New York State Route 194 (NY 194) was a  state highway that was located in Lewis County, New York. It began at an intersection with NY 177 in Barnes Corners, a hamlet within the town of Pinckney, and progressed northeast to its northern terminus at a junction with NY 12 in Copenhagen.

When NY 194 was assigned as part of the 1930 renumbering of state highways in New York, it extended northeast through Copenhagen to NY 26 in Denmark. It was truncated to NY 12 in the late 1930s. On April 1, 1980, ownership and maintenance of NY 194 was transferred from the state of New York to Lewis County as part of a highway maintenance swap between the two levels of government. NY 194 was the only highway transferred to the county as part of the swap. The NY 194 designation was removed just over one month later. Most of its former routing is now County Route 194 (CR 194).

Route description

NY 194 began at an intersection with NY 177 in the hamlet of Barnes Corners within the town of Pinckney in Lewis County. The route first went northward, intersecting with CR 21, where it turned to the northeast. NY 194 continued to the northeast, entering the Pinckney State Reforestation Area. McDown Road, a dirt road, intersected with NY 194 just before the main highway entered the hamlet of Forks Number Two. NY 194 left Forks Number Two and went on towards Copenhagen. Now in the town of Pinckney, NY 194 made several turns in direction until entering the hamlet of Pinckney Corners. At this point NY 194 was edging ever closer to Copenhagen, the largest municipality along the highway.

The route downgraded in elevation and entered Copenhagen. In the heart of the village, NY 194 passed a few businesses and the central school before terminating at an intersection with NY 12.

History
NY 194 was assigned as part of the 1930 renumbering of state highways in New York to an alignment extending from NY 177 in Barnes Corners in the southwest to NY 26 in the northeast via Copenhagen. It was truncated to NY 12 . On April 1, 1980, ownership and maintenance of NY 194 was transferred from the state of New York to Lewis County as part of a highway maintenance swap between the two levels of government. It was the only highway transferred to the county as part of the swap, which involved taking over county-maintained sections of NY 812 from Croghan to Remington's Corners. The NY 194 designation was removed on May 12 of that year. Its former routing from Whitesville Road to the Copenhagen village line is now CR 194 while the former routing within the village is now CR 11 while the small portion that was on Whitesville Road is now part of CR 21.

Major intersections

See also

List of county routes in Lewis County, New York

References

External links

194
Transportation in Lewis County, New York